Devendorf is a surname. Notable people with the surname include:

Bryan Devendorf, American drummer
Eric Devendorf (born 1987), American basketball player
Scott Devendorf, American musician, brother of Bryan
James Franklin Devendorf, pioneer real estate developer and philanthropist